ISWC may refer to:

 International Semantic Web Conference
 International Symposium on Wearable Computers
 International Standard Musical Work Code
 International Speed Windsurfing Class